The World Before Your Feet is a 2018 American documentary film directed by filmmaker Jeremy Workman about Matt Green's mission to walk every street of New York City, a journey of over 8000 miles. The film also marked the producing debut of actor Jesse Eisenberg.

First presented at numerous film festivals, The World Before Your Feet was released theatrically on November 21, 2018 through distributor Greenwich Entertainment. Widely praised upon its release, the documentary holds  rating on Rotten Tomatoes.

Release
The documentary premiered in competition at the 2018 South by Southwest Film Festival where it was acquired by distributor Greenwich Entertainment. It was released theatrically on November 21, 2018, screening in over 70 cities across the United States and Canada during a nearly five month theatrical run.

Following its theatrical run, the film was subsequently made available on multiple streaming sites, including Amazon Prime and a new UK-based site called True Story, which just shows documentaries. A special edition DVD/Blu-ray has been released through Kino Lorber. The film was also widely released in Germany with distributor Happy Entertainment under the title New York Die Welt vor deinen Füßen

Reception
The film was widely praised upon its release. It has  positive rating on Rotten Tomatoes, based on  reviews. The website's critics consensus reads, "The World Before Your Feet offers a perspective on New York City that might be entrancingly unfamiliar even to residents -- and beckons viewers toward a more attentive way of life." On Metacritic, it has a weighted average score of 78 out of 100, based on 5 reviews, indicating "favorable reviews".

The film was a Critic's Pick in The New York Times, in which critic Ben Kenigsberg stated that "after watching The World Before Your Feet, it’s difficult to look at the city the same way."  It was a Critic's Choice of the Los Angeles Times, in which critic Michael Rechtshaffen stated that the film is "inspiring and enlightening... Filmmaker Workman, who's behind [Green] every step of the way without ever getting in the way, allows the city and its colorful denizens to take center stage." Entertainment Weekly called the film "an eye-opening stroll with a stranger" while The Playlist described it as "an utterly compelling joy." San Francisco Chronicle, in a highly positive review, said that "It's hard to see Green in action and not think of traditional pilgrims on holy journeys and, perhaps, hermits or monks or others who have withdrawn from regular life". Rex Reed of The New York Observer stated "New York, New York, it's a wonderful town. This movie proves it like none other."

See also
 I'm Just Walkin' (Matt Green's blog)

References

External links 
 Official Website
 
 
 Official trailer on YouTube

2018 films
2018 documentary films
American documentary films
2010s English-language films
2010s American films